Alīda Ābola (born 29 November 1954) is a former Latvian orienteering competitor. She received a bronze medal in the individual event at the 1989 World Orienteering Championships in Skövde, and finished 5th with the Soviet relay team.

Now she lives in Sigulda, Latvia.

References

1954 births
Living people
Soviet orienteers
Latvian orienteers
Female orienteers
Foot orienteers
World Orienteering Championships medalists